Arthur Ferguson may refer to:
Arthur Ferguson (police officer) (1862–1935), British soldier and police officer
Arthur Ferguson (footballer) (1887–1969), Australian rules footballer
Arthur M. Ferguson (1877–1922), Medal of Honor recipient
Arthur D. Ferguson (1869–1928), banker and philatelist
Arthur Foxton Ferguson (1866–1920), English baritone, lecturer, and German translator

See also
Arthur Furguson (1883–1938), Scottish con artist